Muhammad Zulkhairi bin Zulkeply (born 2 May 1995) is a Malaysian professional football player who plays as a centre-back for KSR SAINS.

Club career

Kedah 
On 23 December 2019, Zulkhairi Zulkeply agreed to join Malaysia Super League side Kedah. He made his debut for the club in 2020 AFC Champions League qualifying play-offs playing against FC Seoul on 28 January 2020.

Negeri Sembilan 
In 2021 he joined the team Negeri Sembilan FC on a free transfer. He has been with the team for two years and has become an important player throughout 2022. He has helped the team secure fourth place in the Malaysia Super League in 2022. It is an impressive achievement as the team has just been promoted from the Malaysia Premier League in the previous year and had shocked the other Malaysia Super League teams as Negeri Sembilan FC was considered an underdog team. He has made 16 appearances during his time with Negeri Sembilan FC.

International career
Zulkhairi was part of 2016 Nations Cup squad.

Career statistics

Club

References

External links
 

Living people
1995 births
People from Penang
Malaysian footballers
Malaysia youth international footballers
UiTM FC players
Penang F.C. players
Kedah Darul Aman F.C. players
Negeri Sembilan FA players
Negeri Sembilan FC players
Association football defenders